Atheris anisolepis, otherwise known as the Mayombe bush-viper, is a species of viper endemic to west-central Africa. No subspecies are currently recognized.

Distribution
Atheris anisolepis is found in southern Gabon, southern Congo, and western Democratic Republic of Congo. It might be present in northern Angola, but was not listed as present by Marques and colleagues (2018).

Habitat
Atheris anisolepis is an arboreal snake that is found in drier areas of shrub and woodland-savanna at elevations below .

References

Further reading

Lawson DP, Ustach PC. 2000. A redescription of Atheris squamigera (Serpentes: Viperidae) with comments on the validity of Atheris anisolepis. Journal of Herpetology (Society for the Study of Amphibians and Reptiles) 34 (3): 386–389.
Golay P, Smith HM, Broadley DG, Dixon JR, McCarthy CJ, Rage J-C, Schätti B, Toriba M. 1993. Endoglyphs and Other Major Venomous Snakes of the World: A Checklist. Geneva: Azemiops. 478 pp.
Mocquard F. 1887. Sur les Ophidiens rapportés du Congo par la Mission de Brazza. Bull. Soc. Philomath., Paris, Series 7, 11: 62–92. ("Atheris anisolepis, n. sp.", pp. 89–92.)

anisolepis
Snakes of Africa
Reptiles of the Democratic Republic of the Congo
Reptiles of Gabon
Reptiles of the Republic of the Congo
Taxa named by François Mocquard
Reptiles described in 1887